Tetrafluoroborate is the anion . This tetrahedral species is isoelectronic with tetrafluoroberyllate, tetrafluoromethane (CF4), and tetrafluoroammonium and is valence isoelectronic with many stable and important species including the perchlorate anion, which is used in similar ways in the laboratory. It arises by the reaction of fluoride salts with the Lewis acid BF3, treatment of tetrafluoroboric acid with base, or by treatment of boric acid with hydrofluoric acid.

As an anion in inorganic and organic chemistry
With organic compounds, especially amine derivatives,  forms potentially explosive derivatives. Disadvantages to  include its slight sensitivity to hydrolysis and decomposition via loss of a fluoride ligand, whereas  does not suffer from these problems. Safety considerations, however, overshadow this inconvenience. With a formula weight of 86.8, BF is also conveniently the smallest weakly coordinating anion from the point of view of equivalent weight, often making it the anion of choice for preparing cationic reagents or catalysts for use in synthesis, in the absence of other substantial differences in chemical or physical factors. 

The  anion is less nucleophilic and basic (and therefore more weakly coordinating) than nitrates, halides or even triflates. In addition to the weakly coordinating nature of the anion,  salts are often more soluble in organic solvents (lipophilic) than the related nitrate or halide salts.

Illustrative of a fluoroborate salt is [Ni(CH3CH2OH)6](BF4)2, a kinetically labile octahedral complex, which is used as a source of Ni2+.

Moreover, in other cases of ostensibly "cationic" complexes, the fluorine atom in fact acts as a bridging ligand between boron and the cationic center. For instance, the gold complex [μ-(DTBM-SEGPHOS)(Au–BF4)2] was found crystallographically to contain two Au–F–B bridges.

Despite the low reactivity of the tetrafluoroborate anion in general,  serves as a fluorine source to deliver an equivalent of fluoride to highly electrophilic carbocationic species to generate carbon–fluorine bonds.  The Balz–Schiemann reaction for the synthesis of aryl fluorides is the best known example of such a reaction.  Ether and halopyridine adducts of HBF4 have been reported to be effective reagents for the hydrofluorination of alkynes.

Transition and heavy metal fluoroborates are produced in the same manner as other fluoroborate salts; the respective metal salts are added to reacted boric and hydrofluoric acids. Tin, lead, copper, and nickel fluoroborates are prepared through electrolysis of these metals in a solution containing HBF4.

Examples of salts
Potassium fluoroborate is obtained by treating potassium carbonate with boric acid and hydrofluoric acid.
 B(OH)3 + 4 HF → HBF4 + 3 H2O
 2 HBF4 + K2CO3 → 2 KBF4 + H2CO3
Fluoroborates of alkali metals and ammonium ions crystallize as water-soluble hydrates with the exception of potassium, rubidium, and cesium. 

Fluoroborate is often used to isolate highly electrophilic cations. Some examples include:
 Solvated proton (H+ (solv.), fluoroboric acid), including H+·(H2O)n ("hydronium"), H+·(Et2O)n
 Diazonium compounds.
 NO+ a one-electron oxidizing agent and nitrosylation reagent.
 NO2+, a nitration reagent.
 Ferrocenium, and other cationic metallocenes.
 Selectfluor, a fluorination agent, and other N–F electrophilic fluorine sources.
Bromonium and iodonium species, including py2X+ (X = Br; X = I: Barluenga's reagent) and Ar2I+ (diaryliodonium salts)
Silver tetrafluoroborate and thallium tetrafluoroborate are convenient halide abstracting agents (although the thallium salt is highly toxic).  Most other transition metal tetrafluoroborates only exist as solvates of water, alcohols, ethers, or nitriles.
 Transition metal nitrile complexes,  e.g. [Cu(NCMe)4]BF4

An electrochemical cycle involving ferrous/ferric tetrafluoroborate is being used to replace thermal smelting of lead sulfide ores by the Doe Run Company.

Imidazolium and formamidinium salts, ionic liquids and precursors to stable carbenes, are often isolated as tetrafluoroborates.

See also
 Non-coordinating anion
Fluoroboric acid

References

 
Non-coordinating anions